The Montrose oil field is a significant crude oil producing field in the UK sector of the central North Sea, 210 km east of Aberdeen. Production of oil started in 1976 and a major upgrade in 2016 extended the field life to beyond 2030.

The field 
The Montrose oil field is located in Blocks 22/17 and 22/18 of the UK North Sea. It is named after the Scottish east coast town of Montrose. The field was discovered in November 1971 and is a Palaeocene sandstone at a depth of 8,000 feet (2,438 m). The reservoir has the following characteristics:

Owners and operators 
The field was originally licensed to a joint venture comprising Amoco UK Petroleum Limited (30.77%), Enterprise Oil plc (30.77%), Amerada Hess Exploration Ltd (23.00%), and Texas Eastern (UK) Ltd (15.38%). The field was originally operated by Amoco (UK) Exploration Company. Ownership of the Montrose field passed from Amoco to BP to Paladin Resources, until Talisman Energy took over, then in 2012 Talisman formed a joint venture with Chinese oil company Sinopec.

Development 
The field was developed by a single integrated production platform Montrose Alpha (or Montrose A). Oil was initially exported through a pair of CALM buoys located 1.7 km from the platform. In 1982 a 48 km 14-inch oil pipeline from Montrose to Forties Charlie was commissioned which provided an oil export route.

Production 
The original processing plant on Montrose A had a nominal capacity of 60,000 barrels of oil per day. Water injection was 55,000 barrels per day. There were 16 production wellheads, and 4 water injection wells. The production of oil (in 1000s barrels) was:There were two Catenary Anchor Leg Mooring (CALM) buoys in 91 metres of water. They were used from 1976 to 1984 to load tankers. They were decommissioned in 1984 when the 48 km 14-inch oil export line from Montrose to Forties Charlie was commissioned.

Montrose was a 'stranded asset' with no nearby export route for gas, the gas was therefore flared. A horizontal 455 feet (139 m) long flare bridge was installed between the platform and the flare (57.451336N 1.390825E). The bridge was supported by a tripod jacket.

Redevelopment 
In 1990, Amoco modified the Montrose A processing equipment to receive oil from the then new Arbroath field integrated drilling and production platform. The discovery of the Wood oil field entailed the installation of the Wood and Gas Export (WaGE) processing and compression module on Montrose A and a new 6-inch pipeline delivered gas into the CATS offshore pipeline on Arbroath.

Three new fields – Godwin, Cayley and Shaw – were discovered in the Montrose area. Additional process facilities were required to develop these fields. Details of the field were as follows:

A new platform was installed adjacent to Montrose A in 2016. This was known as the bridge-linked platform and provided additional process and plant support facilities. Production increased to 40,000 boe (barrels of oil equivalent) per day.

References 

North Sea oil fields
North Sea
Oil fields of Scotland
Oil fields of the United Kingdom